The 2013–14 Hazfi Cup was the 27th season of the Iranian football knockout competition. Sepahan was the defending champion, but was eliminated by 
Sanat Naft in Round of 32. The competition started on 4 September 2013 and ended on 14 February 2014. Tractor won the title with defeating Mes Kerman in the final.

Participating teams
Totally 103 teams participate in the 2013–14 season. These teams are divided into four main groups which are introduced here.

Group 1  (Start their matches from the first round)

 In total 26 teams (24 teams from 24 different provinces in Iran (each province: one), 1 additional team from Tehran province, 1 team from Kish).

 None (Alborz Province)
 Gandomkaran Moghan (Ardabil Province)
 Azar Kowsar Tabriz (Azerbaijan Sharqi Province)
 Pas Ganaveh (Bushehr Province)
 Moghavemat Shahrekord (Chahar Mahaal and Bakhtiari Province)
 Shahrdari Kelachay (Gilan Province)
 Talar Vahdat Hamedan (Hamadan Province)
 Shahrdari Novin Bandar Abbas (Hormozgan Province)
 None (Ilam Province)
 Shahrdari Jajarm (Khorasan Shomali Province)
 Mahvand Mashhad (Khorasan Razavi Province)
 None (Khorasan Jonoobi Province)
 Jonoub Sousangerd (Khuzestan Province)
 Esteghlal Choram (Kohgiluyeh and Boyer-Ahmad Province)
 Shahrdari Kamyaran (Kurdistan Province)
 None (Lorestan Province)
 Payam Vali Asr Markazi (Markazi Province)
 Shohadaye Sari (Mazandaran Province)
 Esteghlal Novin Qazvin (Qazvin Province)
 Ettehad Shadgoli Qom (Qom Province)
 Tees Chabahar (Sistan and Baluchistan Province)
 Shahrdari Zarach Yazd (Yazd Province)
 Parvaz Zanjan (Zanjan Province)
 Shohadaye Nirouye Havayi Tehran (Tehran Province)
 Ettehad Novin Golestan (Tehran Province / Tavabe) 
 Moa'venat Amouzesh-o Parvaresh (Kish Island)

Group 2  (Start their matches from the second round)

 In total 7 teams (7 teams from 7 different provinces in Iran).

 Keyvan Morgh Mahabad (Azerbaijan Gharbi Province)
 Oghab Nirouye Havayi Shiraz (Fars Province)
 Shohadaye Aqqala (Golestan Province)
 Shohadaye Artesh Isfahan (Isfahan Province)
 Gol Gohar Novin Sirjan (Kerman Province)
 Ostandari Kermanshah (Kermanshah Province)
 Pirouzi Garmsar (Semnan Province)

Group 3  (Start their matches from the third round)
 In total 54 teams (All teams playing in 2nd Division League & Azadegan League):

2nd Division League

 Bahman Shiraz
 Bargh Shiraz
 Caspian Qazvin
 Esteghlal Sari
 Etka Golestan
 Foolad Novin
 Gaz Fajr Jam
 Hafari Ahvaz
 Kargar Boneh Gez
 Machine Sazi Tabriz
 Mes Soongoun Varzaghan
 Minab Toyur Hormozgan
 Nabard Shahrekord
 Naft Omidiyeh
 Nozhan Mazandaran
 Payam Sanat Amol
 Persepolis Ganaveh
 Sanat Sari
 Sepidrood Rasht
 Sanat Naft Novin
 Shahin Bushehr
 Shahrdari Arak
 Shahrdari Ardabil
 Shahrdari Dezful
 Shahrdari Jouybar
 Shahrdari Langarud
 Shahrdari Tabriz
 Steel Azin

Azadegan League

 Aboomoslem Khorasan
 Aluminium Hormozgan
 Alvand Hamedan
 Badr Hormozgan
 Esteghlal Ahvaz
 Foolad Yazd
 Gahar Zagros
 Giti Pasand Isfahan
 Gol Gohar Sirjan
 Iranjavan Bushehr
 Mes Rafsanjan
 Naft Gachsaran
 Naft Masjed Soleyman
 Nassaji Mazandaran
 Nirooye Zamini
 Padideh Shandiz
 Parseh Tehran
 Pas Hamedan
 Paykan
 Rahian Kermanshah
 Saipa Shomal
 Sanat Naft Abadan
 Siah Jamegan Khorasan
 Shahrdari Bandar Abbas
 Shahrdari Yasuj
 Yazd Louleh

Group 4  (Start their matches from the fourth round)
 In total 16 teams (All teams playing in Iran Pro League):

Iran Pro League

 Damash Gilan
 Esteghlal
 Esteghlal Khuzestan
 Fajr Sepasi
 Foolad Ahvaz
 Gostaresh Foolad
 Malavan Bandar Anzali
 Mes Kerman
 Naft Tehran
 Persepolis
 Rah Ahan Sorinet
 Saba Qom
 Saipa Alborz
 Sepahan Isfahan
 Tractor
 Zob Ahan Isfahan

First stage
In the First Stage of “2013–14 Hazfi Cup”, 82 teams will be presented. In this stage three rounds will be done, and finally, 13 teams will be qualified for the Second Stage.

The first round will be started with 54 teams. From this round, 26 teams are allowed to go to the second round.  The winners of second round will play in the third round, and finally, 14 teams will go through the Second Stage (fourth round).

First round

Second round

Third round

Fourth round

Second stage

Fifth round (round of 32)

Sixth round (round of 16)

Quarter-Final (1/4 Final - Last 8)

Semi-final (1/2 final – last 4)

Final

Bracket 

Note:     H: Home team,   A: Away team

See also 
 Iran Pro League 2013–14
 Azadegan League 2013–14
 Iran Football's 2nd Division 2013–14
 Iran Football's 3rd Division 2013–14
 Iranian Super Cup
 Futsal Super League 2013–14

References

2013
Hazfi Cup
Hazfi Cup